Paolo Hendel (born 2 January 1952) is an Italian actor, playwright and comedian.

Life and career 
Born in Florence, at young age Hendel made several works, including gamekeeper, guardian of a garage and detective. He debuted as a comedian in early 1980s, as the sidekick of David Riondino. Shorty later he began an
intense theatrical activity as author and actor of comic monologues, characterized by a satirical and surreal style.

Hendel started appearing on television in 1985, then he got a large popularity in 1996, with the Italia 1 variety show Mai dire Gol, in which he created the successful character of "Carcarlo Pravettoni" a cynical capitalist who was candidate for mayor of Milan. Hendel also appeared in several films, starring the main roles in two films directed by Daniele Luchetti, It's Happening Tomorrow and The Week of the Sphinx.

References

External links 

1952 births
Actors from Florence
Italian male stage actors
Italian male film actors
Italian male television actors
Living people
Italian comedians